Hallormsstaður National Forest or Hallormsstaðaskógur  is located in Fljótsdalur east Iceland, about 25 kilometers inland from the town of Egilsstaðir. It is one of the larger forests in Iceland, covering 740 hectares (ha), and includes the only village in Iceland that is located in a forest. The forest is a recreation area in a varied landscape. There are over 40 km of marked trails and footpaths as well as an arboretum, two camp-sites, picnic areas, a hotel, and boat and horse rentals.

History

The birchwood remnants at Hallormsstaður farm were protected in 1905 and thereby became Iceland's first national forest. Birch forest and woodland now covers about 350 ha within the original fenced area and a variety of tree species have been planted on another 200 ha. Large areas have been annexed to the forest more recently, both to the north and south, and either planted or allowed to regenerate naturally with birch. A total of 85 tree species can be found in the forest from over 600 places around the world.

Nature

The forest provides food, nest sites and protection from predators for several bird species. Year-round residents include common redpoll, wren, goldcrest, rock ptarmigan, and common raven. In summer the forest fills with redwings, snipes and meadow pipits along with Eurasian woodcocks and wagtails. Besides birding, the forest offers opportunities for botanizing and picking berries and mushrooms. Edible mushrooms include larch bolete, birch bolete, and slippery jack. Rock bramble is common and raspberries and redcurrants can be found in parts of the forest. Clear streams form a characteristic part of the forest and the water in all of them is drinkable.

Hiking trails

The Part

Yellow trail – 3 km
The trail starts at the car park by the road at Hafursá stream and leads up a gravel road, then under and along a power line.

The Knolls

Blue trail – 5 km
The trail leads up from the old home economics school (now a guest house in summer), past a rock outcrop called the Old Woman and north through the forest. It goes through the Flat Forest, which is a tall (by Icelandic standards) birch forest and thence to Falcon Cliffs, which provides a view over the forest. Then, down through a spruce forest to an open area that was once the farm Ormsstaðir, from where the trail leads back to the start.

Hallormsstaður Moors

Orange trail – 7 km
An easily followed and relatively easily hiked trail between Hallormsstaður Forest and the farm Geirólfsstaðir in the next valley to the east. The trail is the same as the blue trail to begin with, then along the old horse trails under the cliffs above the forest and up onto the moors. The trail provides mountain vistas on a clear day.

Road Forest

Brown trail – 2 km
The trail starts at the north end of the camp-ground Höfðavík, below the main road and along Lagarfljót (the big lake) through a forest of old birches. This is the forest that was here in 1905. 
Atlavík Campground
– Arboretum – Shop

Light blue trail – 1,5 km
The trail leads up a steep slope from the campground at Atlavík and along a footpath to the arboretum. From the arboretum, a footpath leads to the shop by the road. You can also walk across the Höfðavík campground to the brown trail.

Hallormsstaður Cliffs

Light green trail – 4 km
The trail is the same as the orange trail up to the cliffs but then turns right instead of left and passes under the cliffs and back. The trail traverses the big rock slide that much of the forest grows on.

The Strain

White trail – 1,8 km
Remba, or the Strain, is an old trail over the mountain to the next valley and was considered rather difficult. The trail starts at the gymnasium and is fairly steep to begin with. It leads up to the Chest Cliffs and then to the 21 m high Lamb waterfall. A little farther up the stream, you come to a dam that provided water to a 27 kW hydropower plant that was operated from 1936 to 1955. Caution is required as the trail passes along the edge of a small canyon. The trail then leads back the same way.

Atlavík Corral

Red trail – 1,5 km
The trail starts at the main road, leads through a larch stand planted in 1937 with 20 m tall trees and past the ruins of a Viking-age horse corral. The trail passes through more older stands of trees, including lodgepole pine and Douglas fir planted in 1940 and exceptionally straight larch from 1957. The trail winds on through the forest and finally down to the road across from the arboretum.

Glacier Stream

Brown trail – 200 m
A short footpath from the main road up to a mini arboretum that includes Norway spruce and mountain pine planted in 1908 and a variety of species planted in 1963, including: subalpine fir, Engelmann spruce, western hemlock, white spruce, Douglas fir, dragon spruce, lodgepole pine and western red cedar. Unusually good (for Iceland) Scots pine grows along the path.

Light River Slope
Yellow trail – 850 m
The trail leads up a forest road, through stands of Siberian stone pine, lodgepole pine and white spruce to the 16 m high Light river waterfall (Ljósárfoss). On the north side of the trail is some of the straightest growing larch in the forest.

Icelandic National Forests
Lands managed by the Icelandic Forest Service are called National Forests. They are open to everyone, year round, and are located in all parts of Iceland. Many are easy to reach and have a variety of facilities for outdoor recreation. Others require a 4-wheel drive vehicle or hiking up steep hillsides in order to access them.

References

External links 
 "Hallormsstaðaskógur" (in Icelandic).
 "Icelandic Forest Service" Official website of the Icelandic Forest Service (governmental).
 "Hallormsstaður" Tourist Information site.
 "Ljósárfoss waterfall" TripAdvisor ref.

Forests of Iceland
Valleys of Iceland
Forestry initiatives
Nature conservation in Iceland
Tourism in Iceland
Tourist attractions in Iceland
Hiking trails in Iceland
Arboreta